Shahid Ahmadzai (born 15 November 1988) is an Afghan-Canadian cricketer who plays for the Canada national cricket team. He debuted for Canada in 2017, having earlier played for the Afghanistan national under-19 cricket team. He made an asylum claim in Canada in 2009 and was granted permanent residency in 2019.

Early life
Ahmadzai grew up as a refugee in Peshawar, Pakistan.  According to his asylum claim in Canada, his father and older brother were killed in 2002 by relatives associated with the Taliban. After his family returned to Afghanistan, he attended Sayed Noor Mohammad Shah Mina High School in Kabul. He played street cricket from the age of 12 and was selected in the country's under-15, under-17 and under-19 national squads.

Asylum claim
Ahmadzai represented the Afghanistan national under-19 cricket team at the 2009 Under-19 Cricket World Cup Qualifier in Toronto. After the tournament's conclusion, he and four teammates refused to return to Afghanistan and sought asylum in Canada. His asylum claim was not heard until 2013 and was initially rejected, but he was allowed to remain in Canada on an open work permit. He completed his high school in Toronto and subsequently worked in factories, retail, plumbing and as an Uber driver. Ahmadzai applied for Canadian permanent residency on three occasions, eventually being granted the status in 2019. His second application was rejected but the decision was overturned by the Federal Court on appeal.

Career in Canada
Ahmadzai continued to play recreationally in Toronto after claiming asylum, playing for the Toronto Cricket Academy and the Canadian Cricket Club. In 2017 he made his debut for Canada in the Auty Cup fixture against the United States.

In June 2019, he was selected to play for the Edmonton Royals franchise team in the 2019 Global T20 Canada tournament. In September 2019, he was named in Canada's squad for the 2019 Malaysia Cricket World Cup Challenge League A tournament. The following month, he was named in Canada's squad for the 2019–20 Regional Super50 tournament in the West Indies. He made his List A debut on 8 November 2019, for Canada in the 2019–20 Regional Super50 tournament.

References

External links
 

1988 births
Living people
Canadian cricketers
Place of birth missing (living people)
Afghan emigrants to Canada
Afghan cricketers
Afghan refugees
Applicants for refugee status in Canada